Viktor Stanislavovich Koval (29 September 1947 – 1 February 2021) was a Russian-Soviet writer, poet, artist, and actor.

Biography
Koval was born into a family of servicemen. A child actor, he appeared in a number of films from 1955 to 1961. He attended the Moscow Polygraphic Institute in the school of arts, and subsequently drew illustrations for books, magazines, and newspapers. He became a well-known poet in the 1970s, and participated in poetry festivals in Yaroslavl, Volgograd, London, Gothenburg, Milan, and so on.

Viktor Koval died of COVID-19 in Moscow on 1 February 2021, at the age of 73, during the COVID-19 pandemic in Russia.

Filmography
Vasyok Trubachyov and His Comrades (1955)
The Rumyantsev Case (1955)
 (1955)
An Unusual Summer (1956)
 (1957)
 (1958)
 (1961)

References

1947 births
2021 deaths
Soviet writers
Soviet poets
Soviet male actors
Male actors from Moscow
Moscow State University alumni
Deaths from the COVID-19 pandemic in Russia